List of English football transfers 2004–05 may refer to:

List of English football transfers summer 2004
List of English football transfers winter 2004–05
List of English football transfers summer 2005

Transfers
2004